Anders Järryd and Hans Simonsson successfully defended their title, by defeating Carlos Kirmayr and Cássio Motta 6–3, 6–2 in the final.

Seeds

Draw

Finals

Top half

Bottom half

References

External links
 Official results archive (ATP)
 Official results archive (ITF)

1982 Grand Prix (tennis)